Joel U. Nettenstrom was an American architect employed as a staff architect in the Bridge and Building Department of the Chicago, Milwaukee, St. Paul and Pacific Railroad. Several of the railroad stations he designed are listed in the National Register of Historic Places (NRHP).

Works
 Chicago, Milwaukee and St. Paul Depot, Morrisonville, Wisconsin
 Chicago, Milwaukee and St. Paul Depot, 418 Depot Street, New Glarus, Wisconsin (1887), NRHP-listed
 Chicago, Milwaukee and St. Paul Depot, 1811 Parmenter Street, Middleton, Wisconsin (1895), NRHP-listed
 Chicago, Milwaukee and St. Paul Depot, Spencer, Iowa (1900)
 Chicago, Milwaukee and St. Paul Depot, South First Street at Park Avenue, Montevideo, Minnesota (1901), NRHP-listed
 Chicago, Milwaukee and St. Paul fruit receiving house, Milwaukee, Wisconsin (1902)
 Chicago, Milwaukee and St. Paul fruit receiving house, Minneapolis, Minnesota (1902)
 Chicago, Milwaukee St. Paul and Pacific Depot, 219 West Fourth Avenue, Menominee, Michigan (1903), NRHP-listed
 Chicago, Milwaukee St. Paul and Pacific Depot, 650 Hattie Street, Marinette, Wisconsin (1903), NRHP-listed
 Chicago, Milwaukee and St. Paul roundhouse, Galewood, Illinois (1904)
 Chicago, Milwaukee and St. Paul roundhouse, Janesville, Wisconsin (1905)
 Chicago, Milwaukee and St. Paul pattern storage building, West Milwaukee, Wisconsin (1905)
 Chicago, Milwaukee and St. Paul car wheel foundry, West Milwaukee, Wisconsin (1906)

Gallery

References

19th-century American architects
American railway architects
Chicago, Milwaukee, St. Paul and Pacific Railroad
20th-century American architects